The Rubbish Party is a minor political party in Scotland that returned a candidate at the 2017 East Ayrshire Council election, in East Ayrshire, Scotland. The party was re-elected in the 2022 election.

The party was registered by Sally Cogley, of Galston, two months before the election, due to her concern over issues of waste and littering.

History
Prior to forming The Rubbish Party, Cogley was known locally for her anti-litter activism, having organised a series of social media campaigns against fly-tipping and dog fouling in the Loudoun (Irvine) Valley area.  

Cogley formed the party and launched her candidacy for office with a series of clean-up events in the local area and campaigned under such slogans as "Vote Sally for a better valley". Her campaign assured voters that she "aims to make the Irvine Valley a better place to work, live and visit." 

In May 2017, Cogley was elected to represent the Irvine Valley ward on East Ayrshire Council.

In June 2021, The Rubbish Party formed part of the leadership team of East Ayrshire Council alongside the Labour and Co-operative Party when Colgey was appointed as Depute provost, following a vote by Opposition Councillors to replace the incumbent SNP chairpersons.

Elected representatives

East Ayrshire Council

Electoral performance

East Ayrshire Council

References

Political parties established in 2016
2016 establishments in Scotland
Rubbish